The 2010 Gaelic Football Championship is the 2010 season of the tournament, which includes European teams other than those from Ireland and Britain. The Championship follows two phases. During the first part of the year teams compete within their own regions in a series of four to five tournaments to determine the regional champions and runners-up. During the second part of the year the champion and runner-up of each region compete in a series of three pan-European tournaments to determine the European Champion. All teams who did not reach the top two spots of their regional championship compete in a second-tier championship called the Shield. In each tournament teams gain points depending on their respective performances (winner gains 25 points, runner-up 20 points, etc.).
The matches are played 11 a side and 10 to 15 minutes a half (depending on the number of matches to be played on the day).

Regional Phase
During the Regional Phase, only the points gained in each team's best three tournaments count.

Benelux

Table

Round 1 – Amsterdam Tournament – 27 March

Round 2 – Den Haag Tournament – 10 April
This tournament saw 4 teams participating. It has been played in round robin format leading to 3rd place Final and Grand Final.

Group stage

Den Haag 2–9 (15) Amsterdam 0–4 (4)
Belgium A 5–12 (27) Belgium B 0–1 (1)
Amsterdam 3–10 (19) Belgium B 1–2 (5)
Den Haag 1–6 (9) Belgium A 1–6 (9)
Den Haag 4–11 (23) Belgium B 1–3 (6)
Belgium A 2–9 (15) Amsterdam 3–1 (10)

Finals
3rd place Final:
Amsterdam 1–6 (9) Belgium B 0–2 (2)

Final:
Belgium A 1–11 (14) Den Haag 1–10 (13) (after extra time)

Points allowance for the tournament

Round 3 – Brussels Tournament – 8 May

Round 4 – Luxembourg Tournament – 12 June

East and Central

Table

Round 1 – Prague Tournament – 10 April

Round 2 – Vienna Tournament – 24 April

Round 3 – Budapest Tournament – 15 May

Round 4 – Zurich Tournament – 12 June

Iberia

Table

Round 1 – Valencia Tournament – 27 February

Round 2 – Marbella Tournament – 13 March

Round 3 – Madrid Tournament – 8 May

Round 4 – Iruna-Pamplona Tournament – 5 June
This tournament saw 4 teams participating. It has been played in round robin format leading to a Final between the top two teams.

Group stage

Valencia 1–10 (13) Pamplona 0–3 (3)
Madrid 1–7 (10) Barcelona 2–2 (8)
Pamplona 0–4 (4) Madrid 2–9 (15)
Valencia 1–9 (12) Barcelona 1–8 (11)
Pamplona 0–2 (2) Barcelona 1–7 (10)
Valencia 0–2 (2) Madrid 2–4 (10)

Final
Madrid 1–5 (8) Valencia 0–5 (5)

Points allowance for the tournament

Round 5 – Barcelona Tournament – 19 June

North West

Table
After Round 4
If a team participates in all four tournaments, only its three best results count. If two teams have the equal number of points, the fourth result is the decider.
The top two teams qualify for the European Championship. All other teams go on to play the European Shield.

Brest is placed above Paris Gaels Lutetia thanks to a better overall score difference.

Round 1 – Brest Tournament – 10 April
This tournament saw 10 teams participating. For the first part of the tournament, teams were drawn into 3 pools where each team played the other two (2 points for a win, 1 point for a draw, 0 for a loss). After all pool matches were played, the teams were reshuffled into three groups depending on their performance in the pool stage.

Phase 1

Pool A

Paris Gaels 7–5 (26) Vannes 1–1 (4)
Vannes 1–2 (5) Nantes 2–5 (11)
Paris Gaels 8–8 (32) Nantes 0–0 (0)

Pool B

Guernsey Gaels 7–4 (25) Brest 1–0 (3)
Guérande 1–5 (8) Brest 1–2 (5)
Guernsey Gaels 5–7 (22) Guérande 0–1 (1)

Pool C

Rennes 2–7 (13) Saint-Malo 1–0 (3)
Liffré 0–2 (2) Rennes 0–2 (2)
Entente 0–4 (4) Rennes 3–4 (16)
Saint-Malo 0–4 (4) Liffré 0–2 (2)
Saint-Malo 1–4 (7) Entente 0–3 (3)
Liffré 5–2 (17) Entente 0–2 (2)

Pool C table without taking into account each of the top three teams' matches against the bottom team so that the reshuffling is equal.

Phase 2

Championship
(1st to 4th place – knock-out format)

Semi-Final 1: Best of first-placed teams vs. best of second-placed teams
Paris Gaels 3–6 (15) Saint-Malo 0–5 (5)
Semi-Final 2: 2nd best of first-placed teams vs. 3rd best of first-placed teams
Guernsey Gaels 0–7 (7) Rennes 0–3 (3)

3rd place Final
Saint-Malo 0–3 (3) Rennes 0–3 (3) (Saint-Malo won in penalty shootouts 3 to 1)
Final
Paris Gaels 4–9 (21) Guernsey Gaels 0–2 (2)

Shield
(5th to 7th place – round robin format)

2nd best of second-placed teams: Guérande
3rd best of second-placed teams: Nantes
Best of third-placed teams: Liffré

As they have the same goal-average, Guérande and Nantes are ranked according to their head-to-head encounter which turned in favour of Guérande.

Guérande 1–0 (3) Liffré 1–3 (6)
Nantes 1–3 (6) Liffré 0–5 (5)
Guérande 2–0 (6) Nantes 1–1 (4)

Challenge
(8th to 10th place – round robin format)

2nd best of third-placed teams: Brest
3rd best of third-placed teams: Vannes
4th of pool C: Entente costarmoricaine

Brest 1–3 (6) Vannes 1–3 (6)
Vannes 0–2 (2) Entente 4–7 (19)
Brest 2–4 (16) Entente 1–1 (4)

Points allowance for the tournament

Round 2 – Liffré Tournament – 22 May
This tournament saw 12 teams participating. For the first part of the tournament, teams were drawn into 4 pools where each team played the other two (2 points for a win, 1 point for a draw, 0 for a loss). After all pool matches were played, the teams were reshuffled into three groups depending on their performance in the pool stage.

Phase 1

Pool A

Saint-Malo 3–3 (12) Guérande 3–5 (14)
Guérande 0–3 (3) Paris Gaels 0–5 (5)
Saint-Malo 0–0 (0) Paris Gaels 3–7 (16)

Pool B

Jersey/Rennes 3–6 (15) Vannes 0–2 (2)
Vannes 0–0 (0) Brest 2–2 (8)
Jersey/Rennes 4–6 (18) Brest 1–0 (3)

Pool C

Liffré 0–6 (6) Toulouse 0–3 (3)
Liffré 4–6 (18) Entente costarmoricaine 1–0 (3)
Entente costarmoricaine 1–3 (6) Toulouse 0–5 (5)

Pool D

Lyon 0–0 (0) Guernsey Gaels 2–6 (12)
Paris Gaels Lutetia 1–5 (8) Lyon 1–3 (6)
Paris Gaels Lutetia 0–0 (0) Guernsey Gaels 2–8 (14)

Phase 2

Championship
(1st to 4th place – knock-out format)
Top team of each pool
Semi-Final 1:
Liffré 0–8 (8) Jersey/Rennes 0–7 (7)
Semi-Final 2:
Guernsey Gaels 1–6 (9) Paris Gaels 0–0 (0)

3rd place Final:
Paris Gaels won over Jersey/Rennes by forfeit.
Final:
Guernsey Gaels 2–8 (14) Liffré 1–3 (6)

Shield
(5th to 8th place – knock-out format)
Second best team of each pool
Semi-final 1:
Guérande 1–3 (6) Paris Gaels Lutetia 0–2 (2)
Semi-final 2:
Entente costarmoricaine 1–4 (7) Brest 5–2 (17)
7th place final:
Entente costarmoricaine 1–3 (6) Paris Gaels Lutetia 2–3 (9)
5th place final:
Brest won over Guérande by forfeit.

Challenge
(9th to 12th place – knock-out format)
Bottom team of each pool
Semi-final 1:
Vannes 1–0 (3) Toulouse 2–5 (11)
Semi-final 2:
Lyon 2–2 (8) Saint-Malo 0–3 (3)
11th place final:
Saint-Malo 0–3 (3) Vannes 0–4 (4)
9th place final:
Lyon 0–2 (2) Toulouse 1–3 (6)

Points allowance for the tournament
As Jersey and Rennes competed as a single team, the points earned in the tournament are split equally between the two.
Nantes earned 3 points for providing two players or more to Lyon.

Round 3 – Guernsey Tournament – 5 June
This tournament saw 5 teams participating. It has been played in round robin format.

Guernsey A 3–9 (18) Rennes 2–2 (8)
Jersey 5–1 (16) Guernsey B 1–0 (3)
Guernsey A 0–8 (8) Jersey 1–2 (5)
Guernsey B 3–2 (11) Rennes 5–6 (21)
Saint-Malo 1–0 (3) Jersey 8–3 (27)
Rennes 5–2 (17) Jersey 5–0 (15)
Guernsey B 3–4 (13) Saint-Malo 2–2 (8)
Guernsey A 8–5 (29) Guernsey B 1–4 (7)
Saint-Malo 3–3 (12) Guernsey A 3–9 (18)
Rennes 5–8 (23) Saint-Malo 3–1 (10)

Points allowance for the tournament

Round 4 – Paris Tournament – 12 June
This tournament saw 6 teams participating. For the first part of the tournament, teams were drawn into 2 pools where each team played the other two (2 points for a win, 1 point for a draw, 0 for a loss). The top two teams of each group went on to play the semi-finals whereas the bottom team of each group played the 5th/6th ranking match.

Phase 1

Pool A

Paris Gaels 4–7 (19) Paris Gaels Lutetia 2–1 (7)
Paris Gaels 3–12 (21) Vannes 0–1 (1)
Paris Gaels Lutetia 1–1 (4) Vannes 5–5 (21)

Pool B

Lyon 1–3 (6) Saint-Malo 2–5 (11)
Saint-Malo 0–4 (4) Jersey 4–9 (21)
Jersey 1–9 (12) Lyon 0–3 (3)

Phase 2
Semi-final 1: 1st of pool A vs. 2nd of pool B
Paris Gaels 4–12 (24) Saint-Malo 1–2 (5)

Semi-final 2: 1st of pool B vs. 2nd of pool A
Jersey 3–12 (21) Vannes 0–3 (3)

5th place final: 3rd of pool A vs. 3rd of pool B
Paris Gaels Lutetia 1–5 (8) Lyon 2–3 (9)

3rd place final: loser of semi-final 1 vs. loser of semi-final 2
Saint-Malo 1–5 (8) Vannes 1–3 (6)

Final: winner of semi-final 1 vs. winner of semi-final 2
Paris Gaels 1–11 (14) Jersey 3–1 (10)

Points allowance for the tournament

Scandinavia

Table
After Round 1
If a team participates in all four tournaments, only its three best results count.
The top two teams qualify for the European Championship. All other teams go on to play the European Shield.

Round 1 – Copenhagen Tournament – 22 May
This tournament saw 5 teams participating. It has been played in round robin format leading to a Final between the top two teams.

Group stage

Malmö 0–5 (5) Copenhagen 0–4 (4)
Gothenburg 1–6 (9) Oslo 0–0 (0)
Stockholm 1–6 (9) Malmö 1–3 (6)
Copenhangen 3–7 (16) Gothenburg 0–1 (1)
Oslo 0–1 (1) Stockholm 1–7 (10)
Malmö 0–5 (5) Gothenburg 0–4 (4)
Copenhagen 3–4 (13) Oslo 0–0
Gothenburg 1–1 (4) Stockholm 1–9 (12)
Oslo 0–1 (1) Malmö 0–7 (7)
Stockholm 0–6 (6) Copenhagen 0–3 (3)

Final
Stockholm 0–2 (2) Malmö 0–6 (6)

Points allowance for the tournament

Round 2 – Malmö Tournament – 19 June

Round 3 – Oslo Tournament – 10 July

Round 4 – Gothenburg Tournament – 14 August
This tournament saw 4 teams participating.
It was played in round robin format leading to a Final between the top two teams.

Group stage

Malmö 0–1 (1) Stockholm 1–4 (7)
Gothenburg 1–5 (8) Copenhangen 0–3 (3)
Malmö 1–9 (12) Gothenburg 2–6 (12)
Stockholm 3–6 (15) Copenhagen 0–2 (2)
Malmö 1–5 (8) Copenhagen 0–3 (3)
Gothenburg 0–3 (3) Stockholm 0–4 (4)

Final
Gothenburg 2–2 (8) Stockholm 3–13 (21)

Points allowance for the tournament

Pan-European Phase

Championship

Table
After round 2

Round 1 – Munich Tournament – 11 September
This tournament saw 5 teams participating. It has been played in round robin format followed by a 3rd/4th final and a Grand Final.

Guernsey 1–3 (6) Luxembourg 2–8 (14)
Belgium 2–2 (8) Paris 2–4 (10)
Luxembourg 0–6 (6) Den Haag 1–7 (10)
Belgium 2–4 (10) Guernsey 1–7 (10)
Den Haag 0–9 (9) Paris 0–7 (7)
Luxembourg 1–1 (4) Belgium 4–4 (16)
Paris 4–4 (16) Guernsey 0–3 (3)
Belgium 0–6 (6) Den Haag 0–5 (5)
Paris 2–7 (13) Luxembourg 2–2 (8)
Guernsey 0–1 (1) Den Haag 1–6 (9)

Finals
Third place final
Belgium 1–3 (6) Luxembourg 1–4 (7)

Final
Den Haag 2–7 (13) Paris 2–3 (9)

Points allowance for the tournament

Round 2 – Budapest Tournament – 9 October
This tournament saw 7 teams participating. For the first part of the tournament, teams were drawn into 2 pools where each team played the other two or three (2 points for a win, 1 point for a draw, 0 for a loss). The top two teams of each group went on to play the semi-finals whereas the 3rd-placed team of each group played the 5th/6th ranking match.

Phase 1

Pool A

Guernsey 0–6 (6) Belgium 0–10 (10)
Belgium 1–3 (6) Den Haag 0–7 (7)
Guernsey 1–4 (7) Den Haag 3–9 (18)

Pool B

Budapest 1–5 (8) Stockholm 3–3 (12)
Luxembourg 1–1 (4) Paris 4–2 (14)
Stockholm 0–8 (8) Luxembourg 1–3 (6)
Budapest 2–4 (10) Paris 2–4 (10)
Stockholm 0–3 (3) Paris 0–13 (13)
Budapest 8–5 (29) Luxembourg 0–1 (1)

Phase 2
Semi-final 1: 1st of pool A vs. 2nd of pool B
Den Haag 3–9 (18) Stockholm 2–2 (8)

Semi-final 2: 1st of pool B vs. 2nd of pool A
Paris 2–3 (9) Belgium 2–10 (16)

5th place final: 3rd of pool A vs. 3rd of pool B
Guernsey 2–4 (10) Budapest 5–3 (18)

3rd place final: loser of semi-final 1 vs. loser of semi-final 2
Paris won over Stockholm by forfeit

Final: winner of semi-final 1 vs. winner of semi-final 2
Den Haag 0–6 (6) Belgium 0–4 (4)

Points allowance for the tournament

Round 3 – Maastricht Tournament – 6 November

Shield

Table
After round 2

Round 1 – Munich Tournament – 11 September
This tournament saw 5 teams participating. It has been played in round robin format followed by a 3rd/4th final and a Grand Final.

Belgium B forfeited their match against Jersey
Frankfurt 2–7 (13) Saint-Malo 1–0 (3)
Jersey 1–6 (9) Copenhagen 0–3 (3)
Frankfurt 1–6 (9) Belgium B 0–0 (0)
Copenhagen 0–3 (3) Saint-Malo 1–3 (6)
Jersey 1–8 (11) Frankfurt 0–4 (4)
Saint-Malo 1–4 (7) Belgium B 0–4 (4)
Frankfurt 1–3 (6) Copenhagen 2–5 (11)
Saint-Malo 0–1 (1) Jersey 2–6 (12)
Belgium B 3–3 (12) Copenhagen 3–1 (4)

Finals
Third place final
Saint-Malo 2–5 (11) Belgium B 0–4 (4)

Final
Jersey 4–10 (22) Frankfurt 0–2 (2)

Points allowance for the tournament

Round 2 – Budapest Tournament – 9 October
This tournament saw 7 teams participating. For the first part of the tournament, teams were drawn into 2 pools where each team played the other two or three (2 points for a win, 1 point for a draw, 0 for a loss). The top two teams of each group went on to play the semi-finals whereas the 3rd-placed team of each group played the 5th/6th ranking match.

Phase 1

Pool A

Frankfurt 2–5 (11) Prague 5–8 (23)
Prague 6–7 (25) Warsaw 3–5 (14)
Frankfurt 2–4 (10) Warsaw 5–7 (22)

Pool B

Amsterdam 1–6 (9) Copenhagen 3–3 (12)
Belgium B 2–2 (8) Vienna 1–3 (6)
Copenhagen 2–2 (8) Belgium B 0–8 (8)
Amsterdam 0–5 (5) Vienna 0–4 (4)
Copenhagen 2–5 (11) Vienna 3–3 (12)
Amsterdam 1–5 (8) Belgium B 2–3 (9)

Phase 2
Semi-final 1: 1st of pool A vs. 2nd of pool B
Prague 5–8 (23) Copenhagen 2–5 (11)

Semi-final 2: 1st of pool B vs. 2nd of pool A
Belgium B 3–2 (11) Warsaw 0–13 (13)

5th place final: 3rd of pool A vs. 3rd of pool B
Frankfurt won over Amsterdam by forfeit

3rd place final: loser of semi-final 1 vs. loser of semi-final 2
Copenhagen 1–5 (8) Belgium B 0–3 (3)

Final: winner of semi-final 1 vs. winner of semi-final 2
Prague 2–5 (11) Warsaw 0–11 (11) Warsaw won in the penalties shootout 5–4

Points allowance for the tournament

Round 3 – Maastricht Tournament – 6 November

See also
Europe GAA

External links
Europe GAA website
Fédération Française de Football Gaélique 
GaelicSportsCast

European Gaelic Football Championship